The 2018 GoPro Grand Prix of Sonoma was the 17th and final race of the 2018 IndyCar Series season. The race was held on September 16 at Sonoma Raceway in Sonoma, California. 2014 Indy 500 winner Ryan Hunter-Reay qualified on pole position, and took victory in the 85-lap race.

This also marked the last IndyCar Series race at Sonoma, as in 2019, the season finale will be held at the WeatherTech Raceway Laguna Seca.

It was also the final race for Verizon Communications as the series sponsor, as NTT took over as title sponsor for 2019.

Results

Qualifying

Race 

Notes:
 Points include 1 point for leading at least 1 lap during a race, an additional 2 points for leading the most race laps, and 1 point for Pole Position.

Championship standings after the race 

Drivers' Championship standings

Manufacturer standings

 Note: Only the top five positions are included.

References 

GoPro Grand Prix of Sonoma
2018 Grand Prix of Sonoma
2018 Grand Prix of Sonoma
September 2018 sports events in the United States